is a racing video game developed by Sega and AM1 and released in Japan, Europe, and North America in 1993. It constitutes the third release in the arcade OutRun series and was ported to the Mega Drive in 1994.

Description

OutRunners is the fourth game in the Out Run series, following Battle Out Run and Turbo Outrun. After Turbo Outrun's departure from Out Run's laid-back, charming atmosphere, fans wanted a game that captured the spirit of the original. OutRunners succeeded in doing this; it brought back the ability to take different paths through forks in the road, returned to a lighthearted atmosphere, and distanced itself well from the "serious" Turbo Outrun. The game featured head-to-head support, and with enough cabinets, up to eight players could challenge each other. It was also the only game in the Out Run series to feature various selectable cars and multiple endings until OutRun 2. OutRunners was the most successful game released for Sega's System Multi 32 hardware, and one of the last successful 2D games released by Sega. OutRunners was also known for having some of the best looking graphics seen at the time, thanks to creative sprite design and a very skillful use of parallax scrolling, similar to that found in Power Drift, released four years earlier. The game holds up very well today, and plays very similarly to a modern polygon based 3D racer, something not common in a racing game that uses 2D graphics.

Some routes are accessible on more than one route combination like in the original Out Run.  After the initial starting stage, the player has the option of either turning east or west. West leads through San Francisco, through the Easter Islands, into Asia and either into Africa or Europe. East goes through the Grand Canyon, South America or Niagara Falls, across the Atlantic Ocean, into Europe and either into Asia or Australia.

An anthropomorphic broad bean character is featured on billboards and the start of the game called "Broad Bean", a parody of Bibendum (the Michelin man), presumably the mascot of the fictional company sponsoring the race, Sam Spree.
In the Mega Drive version, both Sonic and Tails may fly by in a pair of Tornados and sprinkle the Sega logo onto the screen. Sonic can also be seen on various billboards in the first stage.

All of the selectable cars in OutRunners are fictional convertibles, but bear resemblance to real automobiles. Notably, the Speed Buster closely resembles the Ferrari Testarossa featured in the original OutRun. Each car has its own set of a driver and passenger character, and have their own unique ending vignette if the player makes it to a goal. Each character set also has their own way of acting when their car crashes (flying through the air, bouncing like balls, running after the car, etc.), but unlike their OutRun counterparts, they always land right back in the car and keep going without stopping.

Development
OutRunners features all four of the songs from the original OutRun by Hiroshi Kawaguchi, as well as various new tracks composed by Takenobu Mitsuyoshi and Takayuki Nakamura, along with contributions from Kawaguchi.

Release 
A port of the game was released for the Mega Drive by Sega and for the Genesis by Data East. It featured a forced split-screen in single player modes, where one screen focused on the player and the other on the AI. Though the graphics were merely an adaptation of the arcade version, all other features of this version were kept intact, such as the original arcade soundtrack featuring four songs from the original Outrun. Andy Dyer wrote in Mega that it was "the most embarrassing driving game to appear on the Mega Drive".

In October 1993, Atari Corporation filed a lawsuit against Sega for an alleged infringement of a patent originally created by Atari Corp. in the 1980s, with the former seeking a preliminary injunction to stop manufacturing, usage and sales of hardware and software for both Sega Genesis and Game Gear. On September 28, 1994, both parties reached a settlement in which it involved a cross-licensing agreement to publish up to five titles each year across their systems until 2001. The Genesis version of OutRunners was one of the first five titles approved from the deal by Sega to be converted for the Atari Jaguar, but it was never released.

Reception 

In Japan, Game Machine listed OutRunners on their July 1, 1993, issue as being the most-successful upright/cockpit arcade unit of the month. It went on to be Japan's fourth highest-grossing dedicated arcade game of 1994, and tenth highest of 1995.

In North America, Play Meter listed it to be the seventh most-popular arcade game in October 1993, and then the top-grossing deluxe arcade game in November 1993. It ended the year as one of America's top seven best-selling arcade games of 1993, for which it received a Gold award in sales achievement from the American Amusement Machine Association (AAMA).

Online version 
In May 1993, Sega of Japan demonstrated an online game version of OutRunners, allowing up to eight players to play the game across two different cities in Japan. It was the first online arcade game to be demonstrated, with two separate OutRunner four-player cabinets connected in Tokyo and Osaka connected online via an Integrated Services Digital Network (ISDN) operated by Nippon Telegraph and Telephone (NTT). Sega announced plans for a Japanese release in July 1993. A month later in June 1993, AT&T announced plans with Sega of America to introduce a similar online console gaming system for the Sega Genesis.

Notes

References

External links
OutRunners at Killer List of Videogames

1992 video games
Arcade video games
Cancelled Atari Jaguar games
Easter Island in fiction
Multiplayer and single-player video games
OutRun
Racing video games
Sega arcade games
Sega Genesis games
Sega System 32 games
Split-screen multiplayer games
WOW Entertainment games
Video games developed in Japan
Video games scored by Hiroshi Kawaguchi
Video games scored by Takayuki Nakamura
Video games set in Africa
Video games set in Australia
Video games set in Canada
Video games set in China
Video games set in Easter Island
Video games set in Egypt
Video games set in Europe
Video games set in Germany
Video games set in France
Video games set in Hong Kong
Video games set in Japan
Video games set in Hawaii
Video games set in Italy
Video games set in Russia
Video games set in South America
Video games set in Spain
Video games set in the United States